2008 was designated as:
International Year of Languages
International Year of Planet Earth
International Year of the Potato
International Year of Sanitation

The Great Recession, a worldwide recession which began in 2007, continued through the entirety of 2008.

Events

January–February
 January 1 – Cyprus and Malta adopt the euro currency.
 January 14 – At 19:04:39 UTC, the uncrewed MESSENGER space probe is at its closest approach during its first flyby of the planet Mercury.
 January 21
Stock markets around the world plunge amid growing fears of a U.S. Great Recession, fueled by the 2007 subprime mortgage crisis.
Online activist group Anonymous initiates Project Chanology, after a leaked interview of Tom Cruise by the Church of Scientology is published on YouTube, and the Church of Scientology issued a "copyright infringement" claim. In response, Anonymous sympathizers took to the streets to protest outside the church (after February 10), while the church's websites and centres were getting DoS attacks, phone line nukes, and black faxes.

 January 24 – A peace deal is signed in Goma, Democratic Republic of the Congo, ending the Kivu conflict.
 February 17 – Kosovo formally declares independence from Serbia, to a mixed response from the international community.
February 18 – WikiLeaks releases allegations of illegal activities carried out by the Cayman Islands branch of Swiss banking corporation Julius Baer; a subsequent lawsuit against WikiLeaks prompts a temporary suspension of the website, but uproar about violations of freedom of speech causes WikiLeaks to be brought back online.

March–April
 March 2 – Venezuela and Ecuador move troops to the Colombian border, following a Colombian raid against FARC guerrillas inside Ecuadorian territory, in which senior commander Raúl Reyes is killed.
 March 8 – Barisan National loses two-thirds majority, for the first time since 1969, to opposition during the 2008 Malaysian general election but still retains control of government. The coalition also loses majority control of five states to the opposition.
 March 9 – The first European Space Agency Automated Transfer Vehicle, a cargo spacecraft for the International Space Station, launches from Guiana Space Centre in French Guiana.
March 19 – An Energy release of a Gamma-ray burst called the GRB 080319B is the brightest event ever recorded in the Universe.
 March 24 – Bhutan holds its first-ever general elections following the adoption of a new Constitution which changed the country from an absolute monarchy to a multiparty democracy.
 March 25 – African Union and Comoros forces invade the rebel-held island of Anjouan, returning the island to Comorian control.

May–June
 May 3 – Cyclone Nargis passes through Myanmar, killing more than 138,000 people.
 May 12 – An earthquake measuring 7.9 on the moment magnitude scale strikes Sichuan, China, killing an estimated 87,000 people.
 May 20–24 – The Eurovision Song Contest 2008 takes place in Belgrade, Serbia, and is won by Russian entrant Dima Bilan with the song "Believe".
 May 21
 Manchester United wins their third European Cup and second Champions League  after they beat Chelsea in the first all-English final in the history of the competition. Manchester United won the match 6–5 on penalties, following a 1–1 draw after extra time.
 The Union of South American Nations, an intergovernmental organization between states in South America, is founded.
 The International Court of Justice awards Middle Rocks to Malaysia and Pedra Branca to Singapore, ending a 29-year territorial dispute between the two countries.
 May 25 – NASA's uncrewed Phoenix spacecraft becomes the first to land on the northern polar region of Mars.
 May 28 – The Legislature Parliament of Nepal votes overwhelmingly in favor of abolishing the country's 240-year-old monarchy, turning the country into a republic.
 May 30 – International Convention on Cluster Munitions is adopted in Dublin.
 June 7–29 – Austria and Switzerland jointly host the UEFA Euro 2008 football tournament, which is won by Spain.
 June 11
 The Fermi Gamma-ray Space Telescope is launched.
 Canadian Prime Minister Stephen Harper formally apologizes, on behalf of the Canadian government, to the country's First Nations for the Canadian Indian residential school system.
 June 14 – Expo 2008 opens in Zaragoza, Spain, lasting to September 14, with the topic "Water and sustainable development".

July–August
 July 2 – Íngrid Betancourt and 14 other hostages are rescued from FARC rebels by Colombian security forces.
 July 11 – South Korea suspends all trips to North Korea's Mount Kumgang after a 53-year-old South Korean tourist is shot and killed by a North Korean sentry.
 July 21 – Radovan Karadžić, the first president of the Republika Srpska, is arrested in Belgrade, Serbia, on allegations of war crimes, following a 12-year-long manhunt.
August 1 – India and United States sign the historic Civil Nuclear deal.
August 1 – Eleven mountaineers from international expeditions die on K2, the second-highest mountain on Earth, in the worst single accident in the history of K2 mountaineering.
 August 6 – President Sidi Ould Cheikh Abdallahi of Mauritania is deposed in a military coup d'état.
 August 7 – Georgia intervenes against Russian-backed separatists in its South-Ossetia and Abkhazia regions, causing Russia to invade Georgia and spark the Russo-Georgian war, the first major European land war of the 21st Century.
 August 8–24 – The 2008 Summer Olympics take place in Beijing, China.
 August 20 – Spanair Flight 5022 crashes at Madrid–Barajas Airport, killing 154 people on board

September–October
 September 5 – Quentin Bryce becomes the first female Governor-General of Australia.
 September 10 – The proton beam is circulated for the first time in the Large Hadron Collider, the world's largest and highest-energy particle accelerator, located at CERN, near Geneva, under the Franco-Swiss border.
 September 15 – Stocks fall sharply Monday on a triptych of Wall Street woe: Lehman Brothers' bankruptcy filing, Merrill Lynch's acquisition by Bank of America, and AIG's unprecedented request for short-term financing from the Federal Reserve.
 September 20 – A suicide truck bomb explosion destroys the Marriott Hotel in Islamabad, Pakistan, killing at least 54 and injuring 266.
 September 28 – SpaceX Falcon 1 becomes the world's first privately developed space launch vehicle to successfully make orbit.
 October 3 – Global financial crisis: U.S. President George W. Bush signs the revised Emergency Economic Stabilization Act into law, creating a 700 billion dollar Treasury fund to purchase failing bank assets.
October 6 – A controversial Peruvian tape regarding a Norwegian oil company causes the 2008 Peru oil scandal, sparking protests which cause Jorge de Castillo's resignation from office.
 October 21 – The Large Hadron Collider (LHC) is officially inaugurated at Geneva.
 October 22 – The Indian Space Research Organisation successfully launches the Chandrayaan-1 spacecraft on a lunar exploration mission.
 October 30 – Floods affected in Northern Vietnam and Central Vietnam and lasted 5 days causing flooding in many provinces and cities.

November–December
November 1 – Satoshi Nakamoto publishes "Bitcoin: A Peer-to-Peer Electronic Cash System".
November 2 – In a race won by Brazilian driver Felipe Massa, British driver Lewis Hamilton ends in 5th place in 2008 Brazilian Grand Prix and becomes the first black driver to win the Formula One World Championship, and the second youngest driver to achieve the feat at the age of 23.
November 4 – – 2008 United States presidential election: Democratic U.S. Senator Barack Obama defeats Republican candidate John McCain and is elected the 44th President of the United States, making him the first African-American to be elected to the office.
November 19 – Claudia Castillo of Spain becomes the first person to have a successful trachea transplant using a tissue-engineered organ.
 November 20 – The Buzzard Coulee Meteorite falls in Saskatchewan. Reported to be 5 times brighter than the full moon and is seen in Alberta, Manitoba, and even North Dakota.
 November 26–29 – Members of Lashkar-e-Taiba carry out four days of coordinated bombing and shooting attacks across Mumbai, killing 164 people.
December 10 – The Channel Island of Sark, a British Crown dependency, holds its first fully democratic elections under a new constitutional arrangement, becoming the last European territory to abolish feudalism.
December 18 –  The International Criminal Tribunal for Rwanda finds Théoneste Bagosora and two other senior Rwandan army officers guilty of genocide, crimes against humanity and war crimes and sentences them to life imprisonment for their role in the Rwandan genocide.
December 23 – A military coup d'état deposes the government of Guinea shortly after the death of longtime President Lansana Conté.
December 27 – Israel invades the Gaza Strip, in response to rockets being fired into Israeli territory by Hamas, and due to weapons being smuggled into the area.
December 31 – An extra leap second (23:59:60) is added to end the year. The last time this occurred was in 2005.

Date unknown
European Certification and Qualification Association is founded.
National Disaster Recovery Fund, a disaster management fund is established by the Government of Jamaica.

Births and Deaths

Nobel Prizes

 Chemistry – Martin Chalfie, Osamu Shimomura, and Roger Y. Tsien
 Economics – Paul Krugman
 Literature – J. M. G. Le Clézio
 Peace – Martti Ahtisaari
 Physics – Makoto Kobayashi, Toshihide Maskawa, and Yoichiro Nambu
 Physiology or Medicine – Françoise Barré-Sinoussi, Harald zur Hausen, and Luc Montagnier

New English words

References

External links
 2008 Calendar at Internet Accuracy Project

 
Leap years in the Gregorian calendar